Joe L. Chasteen (June 8, 1925 – August 17, 2021) was an American politician in the state of Wyoming. He served in the Wyoming House of Representatives as a member of the Republican Party. He attended Chadron State College and the University of Wyoming and was an insurance salesman and businessman.

References

1925 births
2021 deaths
People from Platte County, Wyoming
Chadron State College alumni
University of Wyoming alumni
Businesspeople from Wyoming
Republican Party members of the Wyoming House of Representatives